Noviomagus Reginorum was Chichester's Roman heart, very little of which survives above ground. It lay in the land of the friendly Atrebates and is in the early medieval-founded English county of West Sussex.

Name
The name of the town is given as "Noviomagus" in Ptolemy and "Navimago regentium" in the Ravenna cosmography.  This is believed to be a Latinization of a Brittonic placename meaning "new plain" or "new fields", in other words a clearing in woodland. Its epithet is drawn from the name of the inhabitants — reconstructed variously as Reginorum, Regnorum, Regnentium, Regnensium or Regentium— in order to distinguish it from other places with the same name, notably Noviomagus in Kent. The Regini were either a sub-tribe of the Atrebates or simply the local people designated the 'people of the Kingdom' by the Roman administration. In the second-century Antonine Itinerary register of Roman roads, the name is abbreviated to "Regno".

History
The settlement was first established as a winter fort for the Second Augustan Legion under Vespasian (the future emperor) shortly after the Roman invasion in 43 CE. Their timber barrack blocks, supply stores, and military equipment have been excavated. The camp was in the territory of the friendly Atrebates tribe and was only used for a few years before the army withdrew and the site was developed as a Romano-British civilian settlement.

Kilns have been found from the building in the early 1950s, and a bronze works from the Neronian or early Flavian period; and a dedication to Nero is dated to 58 CE.  The River Lavant was diverted to provide a public water supply.  The town served as the capital of the Civitas Reginorum, a client kingdom ruled by T. Claudius Cogidubnus. Cogidubnus debatably lived in the Palace of Fishbourne, a mile to the west. He is mentioned on the dedication stone of a temple to Neptune and Minerva. Other public buildings were also present: public baths are beneath Tower Street, an amphitheatre near the cattle market (this suffered stone-robbing in the late second century CE, by which time it was presumably no longer in use), and a basilica is thought to have been on the site of the cathedral.

The town became an important residential, market and industrial centre, producing both fine tableware and enamelwork. In the second century, the town was surrounded by a bank and timber palisade which was later rebuilt in stone. Bastions were added in the early fourth century and the town was generally improved with much rebuilding, road surfacing and a new sewerage system. There were cemeteries outside the east, north and south gates.

Decline
By the 380s, Noviomagus appears to have been largely abandoned, perhaps because of Saxon raids along the south coast. According to the Anglo-Saxon Chronicle the town was eventually captured towards the close of the fifth century, by the legendary Ælle of the South Saxons, and renamed Chichester after Ælle's son Cissa. However, although by the 680s the area between Chichester and Selsey had  become the political and ecclesiastical centre of the Saxon kingdom with the kings residence in Orreo Regis (Kingsham), south west of Chichester, and Wilfrid's religious centre in Selsey, the archaeology does not support Anglo-Saxon settlement of the city until the ninth century.

Remains
The dedication stone of the wall of the Assembly Rooms.
Part of a fine Roman mosaic may be seen in situ beneath the floor of the cathedral.
A second mosaic from Noviomagus may be seen at Fishbourne Roman Palace.
One of the town's bastions may be seen in the gardens of the Bishop's Palace.
Chichester's museum The Novium houses many finds from across the city, including the in-situ remains of a Roman bathhouse.

See also
Chichester Castle – medieval castle established in the north of Noviomagus Reginorum
Noviomagus of the Kentish, another city by the same name in Roman Britain

References

External links

History of West Sussex
Archaeological sites in West Sussex
Roman towns and cities in England
Chichester